Richard D. Allen (March 7, 1938 – June 20, 2009) was a Republican member of the Michigan House of Representatives from 1983 to 1994 representing the Thumb.

Prior to his election to the House, Allen was a newspaper editor and reporter for nearly 20 years. He was also a charter member of the Help Line crisis intervention program and worked with the Tuscola County Community Mental Health Services Board.

Early life and education
Allen graduated from Caro High School in 1957. Following graduation, he enlisted in the U.S. Marine Corps with. After service with the Marine Corps, he enlisted in the U.S. Air Force, and was discharged in 1964.

References

1938 births
2009 deaths
Republican Party members of the Michigan House of Representatives
University of Illinois alumni
University of Maryland, College Park alumni
20th-century American newspaper editors
Journalists from Michigan
People from Caro, Michigan
20th-century American politicians
United States Marines
United States Air Force airmen
American male journalists